This is a list of Members of Parliament (MPs) elected for the 24th House of Representatives at 2011 general election.

The list is arranged by electoral district. New MPs elected since the general election and changes in party allegiance are noted at the bottom of the page.

Graphical representation of the House of Representatives
This is a comparison of the party strengths in the House of Representatives of Thailand:

List of MPs elected in the general election
The following table is a list of MPs elected, ordered by constituency. As the constituency boundaries have changed, the "notional incumbent" column lists the party estimated to have won the seat at the 2007 election had that election been conducted under the new boundaries, rather than the member that actually held the seat.



Changes & by-elections
Acting sub-lieutenant Sumeth Rittakanee (PT, Pathum Thani 5th district) resigned his Pathum Thani 5th district seat on 8 March 2012 in order to contest in Pathum Thani Provincial Administration Organization election. At a by-election on 21 April 2012, Kiattisak Songsaeng (DEM) was elected to replace him.
Chinnicha Wongsawat (PT, Chiang Mai 3rd district) was banned from politics 5 years by supreme court on 19 April 2012. At the by-election on 2 June 2012, Kasem Nimmolrat was elected to replace her.
Satapon Maneerut (PT, Lamphun 2nd district) died of nephropathy on 14 July 2012. At the by-election on 26 August 2012, Rangsan Maneerat was elected to replace him.
Kiat Luangkachornwit (BJT, Lopburi 4th district) was disqualified by supreme court on 28 December 2012. At the by-election on 9 February 2013, Pahol Vorapanya (PT) was elected to replace him.
Suthep Thaugsuban (DEM, Surat Thani 2nd district), Thaworn Senniam (DEM, Songkhla 6th district), Satit Wongnongtoey (DEM, Trang 2nd district), Witthaya Kaewparadai (DEM, Nakhon Si Thammarat 3rd district), Issara Somchai (DEM, Party-list), Chumpol Junsai (DEM, Chumphon 1st district), Putthipong Poonnagunt (DEM, Bangkok 7th district), Ekkanat Promphan (DEM, Bangkok 29th district) and Natthapol Theepsuwan (DEM, Bangkok 26th district) resigned on 11 November 2013 in order to lead 2013 Thai protests.

References

External links
The Twenty-Third Member of House of Representatives -  House of Representatives of Thailand

House of Representatives of Thailand